In the 1978 Intertoto Cup no knock-out rounds were contested, and therefore no winner was declared.

Group stage
The teams were divided into 9 groups of 4 teams each.

Group 1

Group 2

Group 3

Group 4

Group 5

Group 6

Group 7

Group 8

Group 9

Other groups
There are some statistics available from other groups, but these are incomplete and it is not clear whether they are connected to the Intertoto Cup.
It was called the International Summer Cup, somehow joined to the Intertoto

Group 1 : First Vienna, FC Genoa, Ujpest Dosza.

07/05/1978   First Vienna - Ujpest Dosza 1-2

10/05/1978   Ujpest Dosza - Genoa 6-3

13/05/1978   First Vienna - Genoa 1-1

17/05/1978   Genoa - Ujpest Dosza 0-1

26/05/1978   Genoa - First Vienna 1-2

30/05/1978   Ujpest Dosza - First Vienna 2-0

N.B: In the group OGC Nizza was retired before starting the cup

Group 2: Bayern Monaco, MTK Budapest, AS Roma, AS Saint Etienne.

06/05/1978 MTK Budapest - Bayern Monaco 0-0

09/05/1978 Saint Etienne - Roma 1-0

12/05/1978 Bayern Monaco - Saint Etienne 6-2

14/05/1978 Roma - MTK Budapest 3-3

17/05/1978 Bayern Monaco - Roma 0-2

17/05/1978 MTK Budapest - Saint Etienne 5-2

20/05/1978 Saint Etienne - Bayern Monaco 1-0

20/05/1978 MTK Budapest - Roma 3-0

24/05/1978 Roma - Bayern Monaco 2-0

24/05/1978 Saint Etienne - MTK BUdapest 1-4

27/05/1978 Bayern Monaco - MTK Budapest 1-3

27/05/1978 Roma - Saint Etienne 3-0

Group 3 : SV Waregem, Olympique Nîmes, TSV 1860 München, AC Perugia

1860 München - Ol. Nîmes 4-2

Ol. Nimes - 1860 Munchen 1-1

Waregem - 1860 München  2-1

1860 Munchen - Waregem  1-1

Ol. Nîmes - Waregem 1-2

Waregem - Ol. Nîmes 1-2

Perugia - Waregem 1-1

Waregem - Perugia 1-2

Perugia - Ol. Nimes 1-0

Ol. Nimes - Perugia 2-3

Perugia - 1860 Munchen 3-1

1860 Munchen - Perugia 2-2

Group 4 : Beerschot VAV, F.C. Nantes, Sparta Rotterdam, S.S Lazio Roma,

Beerschot - Nantes 2-1

Beerschot - Sparta Rotterdam 1-2

Lazio - Nantes 2-1

Lazio - Beerschot 2-3

Nantes - Beerschot 1-2

Sparta Rotterdam - Lazio 1-2

Lazio - Sparta Rotterdam 3-2

Sparta Rotterdam - Beerschot  1-3

Sparta Rotterdam - Nantes 6-2

Nantes - Sparta Rotterdam 1-1

Beerschot - Lazio 2-2

Nantes - Lazio 1-2

Group 8: RWD Molenbeek, Troyes, Vitesse Arnhem, Hellas Verona:

H. Verona - RWD Molenbeek 1-1
 
Vitesse Arnhem - H.Verona 2-1
 
RWD Molenbeek - H.Verona 1-0
 
H.Verona - Vitesse Arnhem 2-0

RWD Molenbeek - Vitesse Arnhem 5-0

Vitesse Arnhem - RWD Molenbeek 0-2

RWD Molenbeek - Troyes 2-2

Troyes - RWD Molenbeek 0-2

Vitesse Arnhem - Troyes 5-3

Troyes - Vitesse Arnhem 1-2

Troyes - H.Verona N.D.

H.Verona - Troyes N.D.

Group 10 : FC VVV Venlo, AC Foggia, Olympique Lyon, Ferencvaros TC 
Budapest

Foggia - Ol. Lyon 0-0

Ol. Lyon - Venlo 1-0

Ferencvaros Budapest - Ol. Lyon 3-0

Venlo - Foggia 2-2

Foggia - Ferencvaros Budapest 2-2

Ol. Lyon - Foggia 0-2

Foggia - Venlo 2-2

Ferencvaros Budapest - Foggia 4-0

Group 12: Vfl Bochum, FC Liege, FC Metz, Atalanta Bergamo

Vfl Bochum - Liege 2-1

Metz - Liege 1-0

Liege - Vfl Bochum 2-1

Liege - Atalanta 3-1

Liege - Metz ?

Vfl Bochum - Metz 5-0

Atalanta - Liege 2-2

Atalanta - Vfl Bochum 1-3

Vfl Bochum - Atalanta 1-2

Atalanta - Metz  1-0

Metz - Atalanta  0-1

See also
 1978–79 European Cup
 1978–79 European Cup Winners' Cup
 1978–79 UEFA Cup

References

 RSSSF: all results by Pawel Mogielnicki

1978
4